Hans Braun may refer to:

 Hanns Braun (1886–1918), German athlete
 Hans Braun (baritone) (1917–1992), Austrian operatic baritone